Sagina nodosa, the knotted pearlwort, is a species in the genus Sagina, native to northern Europe. It is a low-growing plant up to 15 cm tall, with paired leaves up to 1 cm long. The flowers are 5–10 mm diameter, with five white petals.

References

nodosa
Taxa named by Eduard Fenzl